"Gobbledigook" is the first track on Sigur Rós' album Með suð í eyrum við spilum endalaust. It premiered on Zane Lowe's Radio 1 show in the UK on 27 May 2008.

On the European cover of the album, the song's title is spelled "Gobbeldigook". This song was number 55 on Rolling Stones list of the 100 Best Songs of 2008; it also placed at number 71 in Pitchfork Media's "The 100 Best Tracks of 2008" list.

This song is also available on the video game Rocksmith from Ubisoft.

Music video
The video for "Gobbledigook" was released on 27 May 2008 on sigurros.com.
It was filmed in May 2008 by Arni & Kinski, who has previously directed the band's "Glósóli", "Viðrar vel til loftárása" and "Hoppípolla" videos, as well as collaborating with Ryan McGinley, whose recent work has been used as the cover art for Með suð í eyrum við spilum endalaust and the consequent singles. Cinematographer Christopher Doyle shot the video.

The video shows a group of 10 or so young adults participating in nudism or naturism.

Track listing

Charts

Release history

Notes

Sigur Rós songs
2008 singles
Song recordings produced by Flood (producer)
2008 songs
EMI Records singles
Songs written by Jónsi
Songs written by Orri Páll Dýrason
Songs written by Georg Hólm
Songs written by Kjartan Sveinsson